Norman Rothman (aka "Roughhouse", December 26, 1914 in New York City – October 1985) was an American gangster.

Life
Rothman was an infamous member of the La Cosa Nostra operating in South Florida. In 1945 he joined the U.S. Army. He was a close associate of Santo Trafficante, Jr. with whom he would operate casinos in Havana, most notably, the Sans Souci. He ran a bookmaking operation in Havana where he also was involved in running guns to Fidel Castro with Joe Merola and the Mannarino brothers, for which he was convicted February 4, 1960.

After moving back to Miami, Rothman purchased a notable gangster hangout, The Albion Lounge, in the late 1960s and early 70s. He was also involved in narcotics trafficking in Miami. In 1962, he was acquitted for conspiracy to transport, and transporting, stolen securities. In 1969, he was arrested and indicted, and in 1971, he was convicted, of conspiracy relating to the theft of securities.

Criminal record

1/29/48 – Vagrancy – Miami Beach, Fla.
3/27/59 – Firearms Act violation – Miami, Fla.
4/05/59 – Stolen property – Pittsburgh, Penn. (sentenced to 5 years in prison in 1961)
5/01/62 – Receiving and transporting stolen property – Federal Correctional Inst., Tallahassee, Fla.
9/11/63 – Stolen property – Eglin Air Force Base prison camp, Okaloosa County, Fla.
3/17/69 – Vagrancy – Las Vegas, Nev.

Associates
Pasquale "Patsy" Erra
Frank "Lefty" Rosenthal (of the movie "Casino" fame)

Habits
Rothman was known to drink Canadian Club straight with water on the side.

Further reading

References

The Education Forum/Spartacus Educational

1914 births
1985 deaths
Jewish American gangsters
Gangsters from New York City
20th-century American Jews